Do Balutan or Dobalootan or Do Ballutan may refer to:
 Do Balutan, Andika
 Do Balutan, Izeh
 Do Balutan, Masjed Soleyman